Midway Studios Los Angeles Inc. (formerly known as Paradox Development) was an American-based video game developer. They are best known for fighting games such as the X-Men Mutant Academy and Backyard Wrestling franchises, as well as the Mortal Kombat action game spin-off Mortal Kombat: Shaolin Monks. The team was also responsible for the controversially violent PlayStation title Thrill Kill, but the game was later cancelled.

History

CWS Entertainment Ltd./Paradox Development era
Paradox Development was founded in 1994 by Christine Hsu and went on to produce titles for top video game publishers including Activision, Electronic Arts, Virgin Interactive (later acquired by Electronic Arts), Interplay, and Namco. 

In 2004-11-23, Midway Games Inc. acquired CWS Entertainment Ltd., whom was doing business as Paradox Development. Midway announced the acquisition 7 days later, by then Paradox Development was developing Mortal Kombat: Shaolin Monks.

Midway Studios – Los Angeles Inc. era
Following the acquisition by Midway, Paradox Development was renamed to Midway Studios – Los Angeles Inc., sometimes called "Midway Los Angeles" or "Midway L.A."

In 2008, Midway Los Angeles was relocated and merged with Midway's San Diego office. The following year, publisher Midway Games filed for bankruptcy, and in August 2009 the Midway San Diego studio was closed and most of its assets were purchased by publisher THQ, who only offered about 40% of the studio's personnel new positions within the company. Many of the laid-off developers were hired by High Moon Studios.

Developed games

CWS Entertainment Ltd./Paradox Development era

PlayStation

Thrill Kill (unreleased)
Rock 'em Sock 'em Robots Arena
Wu-Tang: Shaolin Style
X-Men: Mutant Academy
X-Men: Mutant Academy 2
Disney's The Lion King: Simba's Mighty Adventure

PlayStation 2

Backyard Wrestling 2: There Goes the Neighborhood
Backyard Wrestling: Don't Try This at Home
Mortal Kombat: Shaolin Monks
X-Men: Next Dimension

Xbox

Backyard Wrestling 2: There Goes the Neighborhood
Backyard Wrestling: Don't Try This At Home
X-Men: Next Dimension

Midway Studios - Los Angeles era

PlayStation 2
Mortal Kombat: Shaolin Monks
TNA iMPACT!

Xbox
Mortal Kombat: Shaolin Monks

Xbox 360

TNA iMPACT!

PlayStation 3

TNA iMPACT!

Wii
 TNA iMPACT!

References

External links
Paradox Development

Midway Games
Entertainment companies based in California
Technology companies based in Greater Los Angeles
Video game development companies
Video game companies established in 1994
Video game companies disestablished in 2008
Defunct video game companies of the United States
1994 establishments in California
2008 disestablishments in California
Defunct companies based in Greater Los Angeles
Warner Bros. Discovery subsidiaries